The 1999 European Tour was the 28th official season of golf tournaments known as the PGA European Tour.

The season was made up of 41 tournaments counting towards the Order of Merit, which included the U.S. Open and PGA Championship for the first time; and several non-counting "Approved Special Events".

The Order of Merit was won by Scotland's Colin Montgomerie for the seventh successive year; he won five official-money tournaments during the season, including Volvo PGA Championship, and also added the Cisco World Match Play Championship.

Changes for 1999
There were many changes from the previous season, with the addition of three new World Golf Championships, the Asian PGA Tour co-sanctioned Malaysian Open, the Estoril Open, the West of Ireland Golf Classic (also a Challenge Tour event), and the Scottish PGA Championship; and the loss of the Johnnie Walker Classic due to rescheduling from January to November, and the Cannes Open. The Open Novotel Perrier was also lost from the schedule as sponsors switched to support the Open de France; the Sarazen World Open, which had been discontinued as a result of the creation of the WGCs, was revived as a full tour event and took the dates on the calendar opposite the Cisco World Match Play Championship.

Schedule
The following table lists official events during the 1999 season.

Unofficial events
The following events were sanctioned by the European Tour, but did not carry official money, nor were wins official.

Order of Merit
The Order of Merit was titled as the Volvo Order of Merit and was based on prize money won during the season, calculated in Euros.

Awards

See also
List of golfers with most European Tour wins

Notes

References

External links
1999 season results on the PGA European Tour website
1999 Order of Merit on the PGA European Tour website

European Tour seasons